Ruth Silverman (born 1936 or 1937, died April 25, 2011) was an American mathematician and computer scientist known for her research in computational geometry. She was one of the original founders of the Association for Women in Mathematics in 1971.

Education and career
Silverman completed a Ph.D. in 1970 at the University of Washington.
She was a faculty member at the New Jersey Institute of Technology,
an associate professor at Southern Connecticut State College, a computer science instructor at the University of the District of Columbia, and a researcher in the Center for Automation Research at the University of Maryland, College Park.

Contributions
Silverman's dissertation, Decomposition of plane convex sets, concerned the characterization of compact convex sets in the Euclidean plane that cannot be formed as Minkowski sums of simpler sets.

She became known for her research in computational geometry and particular for highly cited publications on k-means clustering and nearest neighbor search. Other topics in Silverman's research include robust statistics and small sets of points that meet every line in finite projective planes.

Selected publications

References

External links
 

2011 deaths
American computer scientists
20th-century American mathematicians
21st-century American mathematicians
American women computer scientists
American women mathematicians
Researchers in geometric algorithms
University of Washington alumni
New Jersey Institute of Technology faculty
Southern Connecticut State University faculty
University of the District of Columbia faculty
Year of birth uncertain
20th-century women mathematicians
21st-century women mathematicians
20th-century American women
21st-century American women